The FedEx St. Jude Championship, founded as the Westchester Classic in 1967, is a professional golf tournament on the PGA Tour. Since 2007, it has been played as the first tournament of the playoff system for the FedEx Cup, with the field limited to the top 125 players on the FedEx Cup points list at the end of the regular season. For sponsorship reasons, the tournament has previously been titled as The Northern Trust, The Barclays, and the Buick Classic.

The Westchester Classic was hosted at Westchester Country Club in Harrison, New York until 2007, after which it moved around several courses in New York and New Jersey. In 2018, the PGA Tour announced that The Northern Trust, as it was then known, would alternate between the New York/New Jersey and Boston areas from 2019, and in 2020 it was held at TPC Boston. For the 2021–22 season, the tournament was relocated to TPC Southwind in Memphis, Tennessee with FedEx as the new title sponsor and the event being titled the FedEx St. Jude Championship.

Many of the world's top players have won event including Sergio García, Adam Scott, Jason Day, Matt Kuchar, Patrick Reed, Dustin Johnson and 2018 champion Bryson DeChambeau, who captured a four-stroke victory and became the tournament's youngest winner in the FedEx Cup era. Since the tournament's inception in 1967, The Northern Trust has generated nearly $50 million for New York/New Jersey Metropolitan-area charities, including a record $1.865 million in 2018.

History
The event can trace its origins back to a Westchester based pro-am tournament that began at The Apawamis Club in Rye, New York. Founded by William Mitchell "Bill" Jennings, the popular spectator event drew many top players before leaving Apawamis after 1961 when it was merged into the Thunderbird Classic. It was next played at the Upper Montclair Country Club in Clifton, New Jersey (1962, 1966-68) and the neighboring Westchester Country Club (1963-65) also in Rye. Proceeds from the popular event benefited the now defunct United Hospital in Port Chester, New York for many years.Beginning in 1976, the tournament underwent a series of name sponsorships (detailed below), not unlike other PGA Tour stops. The name of the event evolved to the point that, by 1990, it no longer contained the name of its host course or location. However, among golfers on tour and many fans, it was still known by its traditional name, the Westchester Classic.

The tournament was usually played during June of each year, either the week before (in even-numbered years) or the week after (in odd-numbered years) the U.S. Open. It had its greatest attendance in 2001 when Tiger Woods participated, although two days of heavy rains disrupted play. It had one of its more exciting finishes in 2005, when Pádraig Harrington eagled the par-5 final hole with a  putt to win the title. The most frequent winner of the tournament is Vijay Singh, with four trophies.

Beginning in 2008, it left the Westchester Country Club and began being rotated amongst different clubs in the New York metropolitan area (also detailed below).

In 2011, Hurricane Irene shortened the tournament to 54 holes, which was played that year at the Plainfield Country Club in Edison, New Jersey.  The tournament ended by noontime on Saturday, August 27, allowing ample time for players and spectators to evacuate the golf course.

The tournament has traditionally closed CBS Sports's PGA Tour television schedule, due to the network's commitment to airing SEC and NFL football during the fall months; until 2014, the network also had rights to the U.S. Open tennis tournament, which begins the Monday prior to Labor Day. (The 2019 changes to the PGA Tour calendar, which resulted in The Northern Trust being moved up two weeks due to the PGA Tour's desire to complete the FedEx Cup Playoffs by the end of August, will not affect this tournament ending CBS's golf season, even though the tournament now takes place three weeks before the first week of the college football season.) Jim Nantz, who calls the final two rounds of The Northern Trust on television, is also the lead play-by-play announcer for the NFL on CBS.

In 2017, Chicago-based financial services company Northern Trust replaced Barclays, which had sponsored the tournament since 2005. Northern Trust had previously been the title sponsor of the Los Angeles Open at Riviera for nine years, known as the "Northern Trust Open" from 2008 through 2016.

In 2019, the FedEx Cup Playoffs featured three events, instead of four, and the Playoffs concluded by the end of August. As a result, The Northern Trust was played earlier in August (August 5–11, 2019), followed by the BMW Championship, August 12-18 (70 players); and the Tour Championship August 19–25 (30 players).

Highlights
In 2015, Brian Harman became only the third player in PGA Tour history to record two holes-in-one in the same round.

In 2020, Scottie Scheffler shot a 12-under-par 59 at TPC Boston in the second round.

Winners

Note: Green highlight indicates scoring records.
Sources:

Multiple winners
Seven men have won the tournament more than once through 2021.

4 wins
Vijay Singh: 1993, 1995, 2006, 2008
3 wins
Dustin Johnson: 2011, 2017, 2020
2 wins
Jack Nicklaus: 1967, 1972
Seve Ballesteros: 1983, 1988
Ernie Els: 1996, 1997
Sergio García: 2001, 2004
Patrick Reed: 2016, 2019

Notes

References

External links
Coverage on the PGA Tour's official site

PGA Tour events
FedEx Cup
Golf in New Jersey
Golf in New York (state)
Golf in Massachusetts
Golf in Tennessee
Sports competitions in Massachusetts
Sports competitions in New Jersey
Sports competitions in New York (state)
Sports competitions in Tennessee
Sports in Bristol County, Massachusetts
Sports in Hudson County, New Jersey
Sports in Westchester County, New York
Norton, Massachusetts
Recurring sporting events established in 1967
1967 establishments in New York (state)